Gert and Daisys Weekend is a 1942 British comedy film directed by Maclean Rogers and starring Elsie Waters, Doris Waters and Iris Vandeleur.

It was shot at Welwyn Studios with sets designed by the art director William Hemsley. It was followed by a sequel Gert and Daisy Clean Up

Cast
 Elsie Waters as Gert 
 Doris Waters as Daisy 
 Iris Vandeleur as Ma Butler 
 Elizabeth Hunt as Maisie Butler 
 John Slater as Jack Densham 
 Wally Patch as Charlie Peters 
 Annie Esmond as Lady Plumtree 
 Aubrey Mallalieu as Barnes 
 O. B. Clarence as Vicar 
 Noel Dainton as Detective Inspector 
 Arthur Denton as Village Policeman 
 Vi Kaley as Old Lady Whose Son Is to Be Evacuated 
 David Keir as Magistrates Clerk 
 Jack May as Old Man Dancing on Tube Station 
 Gerald Moore as Tommy 
 Johnnie Schofield as Policeman at Town Hall 
 Leonard Sharp as Small Boys Father
 Jack Vyvyan as Village Policeman 
 Ben Williams as Sam the Fishmonger

References

Bibliography

External links

1942 films
British comedy films
British black-and-white films
1942 comedy films
Films shot at Welwyn Studios
Films set in London
Butcher's Film Service films
Films directed by Maclean Rogers
Films scored by Percival Mackey
1940s English-language films
1940s British films